The 2019 ASEAN Grand Prix is the inaugural edition of the ASEAN Grand Prix, a new annual international women's volleyball tournament which is contested by 4 national teams that are the members of the Southeast Asian Zonal Volleyball Association (SEAZVA), the sport's regional governing body affiliated to Asian Volleyball Confederation (AVC).

The first leg was held in Thailand on September while the second leg was held in the Philippines on October.

Teams
Four national teams featured in the 2019 ASEAN Grand Prix. Indonesia was decided not to participate in the second leg, and a selection team from the Philippine Super Liga planned to replace. However, Indonesia decided to participate in the second leg.

Venues
The first leg was played at the Terminal 21 Korat, Nakhon Ratchasima, Thailand, and the second leg was played at the Santa Rosa Sports Complex, Santa Rosa, Laguna, Philippines.

Squads

Results and standings

Grands Prix

Standings

|}

References

ASEAN Grand Prix
ASEAN Grand Prix
ASEAN Grand Prix
ASEAN Grand Prix
ASEAN